Ahmad Ali Al-Mirghani (16 August 1942 – 2 November 2008) was the 6th President of Sudan from May 6, 1986, to June 30, 1989, when the democratically elected government was overthrown by a military coup led by Omar al-Bashir.

Early life
Al-Mirghani was the descendant of the respected Mirghani family of Sudan and the great-great-grandson of Al Sayyid Mohammed Uthman al-Mirghani al-Khatim. Ahmad Al-Mirghani held the title of Sayyid, denoting that he was accepted as a descendant of the Islamic prophet Muhammad. He graduated with a First class degree from the University of London and returned to Sudan. His daughter currently resides in London with her four male children, two of whom are also at colleges that are a part of the University of London. He progressed through a professional career until the elections of 1986 when he was elected as the President of Sudan. He played a major role in convincing King Faisal of Saudi Arabia to travel and meet President Nasser of Egypt in Sudan in the famous 1967 Arab League summit in Khartoum.

Presidency
Al-Mirghani was elected President of Sudan in May 1986 after the country's last democratic elections. He was unseated in a 1989 coup led by Omar al-Bashir.

Later years
Following the coup Al-Mirghani lived in Alexandria, Egypt. He returned to Sudan shortly before his death and lobbied for peace on the War in Darfur.
He actively worked on the Darfur file and was chosen as the head of the Darfur Circle in the Democratic Unionist Party. His final trip abroad was to Libya where he held a number of meetings with Darfur rebel groups and the Libyan leadership regarding the solutions to the Western Sudan problem.

Death
Al-Mirghani died in Egypt on November 2, 2008, at the age of 66. Several Sudanese politicians including the president travelled to the Mirghani base in Khartoum to mourn the former president. His body was flown to Khartoum on November 5, and his funeral was held there on the same day. The funeral procession travelled from the airport in the south of the capital Khartoum through the city streets to the north of the capital, where he was buried.

Panama Papers

In April 2016, al-Mirghani was named in the Panama Papers as owner of Orange Star Corporation, which was created in 1995 and based in the British Virgin Islands, an offshore tax haven that is often used for tax-evasion purposes. The Panama Papers revealed that Orange Star bought an apartment North of the Hyde Park area in London for £600,000. Today, apartments in the same area are sold for over 2 million British pounds. In 2008 at the time of al-Mirghani's death through the company he held 2.72 million US dollars in assets.

References

External links
 The Times: Ahmed al-Mirghani: Democratic Sudanese President

1942 births
2008 deaths
People from Khartoum North
Presidents of Sudan
Democratic Unionist Party (Sudan) politicians
Leaders ousted by a coup
Alumni of the University of London
Husaynids
People named in the Panama Papers